Marcos Aurélio Lima Barros (born August 16, 1982), commonly known as Marquinhos, is a former Brazilian footballer who played as a midfielder.

Career
Marquinhos began his career in Portuguese football as a youngster with Rio Ave. He played in lower-division senior football with Vianense and Oliveira do Bairro before making his Primeira Liga debut with Rio Ave in April 2005. He scored three goals from 23 appearances, mostly in the 2005–06 season, before spending loan spells at Brazilian clubs Caldense in 2006 and Francana, his hometown team, in 2007. He returned to Brazil permanently in 2008 and played for Gama, Arapongas and another spell with Francana.

References

1982 births
Living people
Brazilian footballers
People from Franca
Association football midfielders
Rio Ave F.C. players
SC Vianense players
Associação Atlética Caldense players
Associação Atlética Francana players
Sociedade Esportiva do Gama players
Segunda Divisão players
Primeira Liga players
Brazilian expatriate footballers
Footballers from São Paulo (state)